The Toro Negro River is a river of Ciales, Orocovis, and Jayuya in Puerto Rico.

Gallery

See also
List of rivers of Puerto Rico
Toro Negro State Forest

References

External links
 USGS Hydrologic Unit Map – Caribbean Region (1974)
Rios de Puerto Rico

Rivers of Puerto Rico